Shelton Cornelius Hammonds (born February 13, 1971) is a former American football defensive back who played for the Minnesota Vikings of the National Football League (NFL). He played college football at Penn State University.

References 

American football defensive backs
Living people
Penn State Nittany Lions football players
1971 births
Minnesota Vikings players